Franz Anton von Raab (1722-1783) was an Austrian agrarian reformer and a minister under Maria Theresa.

His daughter Eleonore von Raab built up a substantial collection of minerals which was widely known after being catalogued by Ignaz von Born.

References

1722 births
1783 deaths
Government ministers of Austria-Hungary